Murat Akşit (born 2 January 2002) is a Turkish footballer who plays as a goalkeeper for Pendikspor.

Career
Akşit is a youth product of Dolayoba Dumlupinarspor and Pendikspor, and made one appearance for Pendikspor in the TFF Second League at the age of 17. He transferred to Yeni Malatyaspor on 10 July 2019. He made his professional debut with them in a 3–1 Süper Lig loss to Çaykur Rizespor on 8 May 2022.

International career
Akşit is a youth international for Turkey, having played for the Turkey U17s and U18s.

References

External links
 

2002 births
Footballers from Istanbul
Living people
Turkish footballers
Turkey youth international footballers
Association football goalkeepers
Pendikspor footballers
Yeni Malatyaspor footballers
Süper Lig players
TFF Second League players